Dookudu is a 2011 Indian Telugu-language action comedy film directed by Srinu Vaitla, and jointly produced by Ram Achanta, Gopi Achanta and Anil Sunkara. The film features Mahesh Babu,  Samantha, Prakash Raj, and Sonu Sood in the lead roles, and Brahmanandam, and M. S. Narayana in supporting roles. It was edited by M. R. Varma and the cinematography was provided by K. V. Guhan and Prasad Murella. The film's musical and background score were composed by S. Thaman.

Partially inspired by the 2003 German tragicomedy film Good Bye, Lenin!, Dookudu revolves around the life of police officer Ajay Kumar (Mahesh). His father Shankar Narayana (Prakash Raj) awakes from a coma, which he has been in for many years after an accident, but his health remains perilous. To aid his recovery, Kumar masquerades as a Member of the Legislative Assembly fulfilling his father's ambition for him.

Dookudu was released on 23 September 2011 in 1,600 screens worldwide, and grossed 1.01 billion worldwide on a budget of 350 million. Steven Zeitchik of Los Angeles Times called it "the biggest hit you've never heard of". The film garnered awards and nominations in several categories with particular praise for its direction, performances of the film's cast, cinematography, and music. As of April 2013, the film has won 38 awards from 50 nominations.

At the 2012 Nandi Awards ceremony, Dookudu won seven awards, including those for Best Popular Feature Film and Best Actor. The film won six awards at the 59th Filmfare Awards South ceremony, including the awards for Best Film, Best Director, and Best Actor, from ten nominations. Samantha and Prakash Raj also garnered nominations for Best Actress and Best Supporting Actor, respectively. Dookudu received eleven nominations at the 1st South Indian International Movie Awards ceremony and won eight awards, including those for Best Film, Best Director and Best Actor. Samantha and M. S. Narayana were nominated for Best Actress and Best Comedian, respectively. The film won eight awards at the 2012 CineMAA Awards ceremony, including those for Best Film, Best Director, Best Actor, and Best Cinematography.

Accolades

See also 
 List of Telugu films of 2011

Footnotes

References

External links 
 Accolades for Dookudu at the Internet Movie Database

Lists of accolades by Indian film